Kara Crane is an American actress. She is best known for her role as Jeanette Pachelewski in the Disney Channel original film Minutemen.

Career
Crane attended Orange County School of the Arts as a Music & Theatre major. She has guest starred in the television series The Suite Life on Deck, Bucket & Skinner's Epic Adventures, The Mindy Project, Awkward and Baby Daddy. She also starred in the Nickelodeon pilot "Summer Camp".

Filmography

Film

Television

Web

References

External links
 

Actresses from California
Living people
Orange County School of the Arts alumni
21st-century American actresses
Year of birth missing (living people)